A stock tie, or stock, is a style of neck wear. Originally a form of neck-cloth that was often stiffened and usually close-fitting, formerly worn by men generally, but post-nineteenth century only in use in military uniforms. Another type of stock is worn by certain clergy and consists of black silk or other fabric, that falls over the chest and is secured by a band around the neck. Equestrians wear a stock tie around the neck when dressed formally for a hunt or certain competitive events. Most equestrian competition rules require it to be white. It is mandated attire for use in dressage and the dressage phase of eventing. Use of the stock tie also is seen in show jumping and fox hunting. The stock tie continues to be in fashion for equestrians.

History 
The stock tie was worn by gentlemen as everyday apparel in the eighteenth and nineteenth centuries. It became more of a formal tie in the later nineteenth century. These old stock ties often were black or white. They were made of gauze, fine cotton, or silk. Sometimes the stock tie was starched or otherwise reinforced to be stiff around the neck; with the chin forced up, it was presumed that the wearer would look more important and formal.

Traditionally, the stock tie is used in the hunt field as a safety measure: in case of injury, the tie may be used as a temporary bandage for a horse's leg or a sling for a rider's arm. It also is useful in keeping rain or wind out of the rider's collar. Stock ties often are worn by riders along with a shadbelly.

Some stock ties buckled or hooked up the back, and sometimes had bows or ruffles attached to the front.

Today it is worn with a pin (usually plain and gold, although more elaborate pins also are seen). The pin is stuck through the knot or just below the knot and derives its name from the tie, being called a "stock pin".

See also
 Cravat (early)
 Cravat (modern)
 Stock (military), a leather collar worn by soldiers during the 18th century

References

Rider apparel
19th-century fashion
Neckties
18th-century fashion
Victorian fashion